Artizon Museum , until 2018 , is an art museum in Tokyo, Japan.

The museum was founded in 1952 by the founder of Bridgestone Tire Co., Ishibashi Shojiro (his family name means stone bridge).  The museum's collections include Impressionists, Post-Impressionists and twentieth-century art by Japanese, European and American artists, as well as ceramic works from Ancient Greece.  The museum was located in the headquarters of the Bridgestone Corporation in Chūō, Tokyo.

Closure and eventual reopening
The museum closed its doors on 18 May 2015 in order to make way for the construction of a new building, to where the museum would be relocated, reopening in January 2020.  Construction of the new building (tentatively named the Nagasaka Sangyo Kyobashi Building) begun with a groundbreaking ceremony on June 17, 2016 and was completed in 2019. The museum's new name was announced in 2018, combining the words "art" and "horizon". During the long-term closure, various items from the museum's collection have been loaned out for display in other institutions.

Selected artists

 Edgar Degas
 Pierre-Auguste Renoir
 Camille Pissarro
 Édouard Manet
 Vincent van Gogh
 Paul Gauguin
 Gustave Moreau
 Paul Cézanne
 Claude Monet
 Amedeo Clemente Modigliani
 Maurice Denis
 Georges Rouault
 Pablo Picasso
 Paul Klee
 Narashige Koide
 Tsuguharu Foujita
 Fujishima Takeji
 Shigeru Aoki

Ishibashi Foundation Art Research Center
The  opened in Machida in 2015 as a research facility for the Artizon Museum. Focused upon the research, storage, and preservation and restoration of the collection, since 2017 school groups have been welcomed, there are also lectures and workshops for the public, and a library open to researchers.

See also
 List of Cultural Properties of Japan - paintings (Tōkyō)
 Ishibashi Museum of Art

References

External links 
 Artizon Museum
 former Bridgestone Museum of Art
Artizon Museum within Google Arts & Culture

1952 establishments in Japan
Art museums and galleries in Tokyo
Art museums established in 1952
Bridgestone
Buildings and structures in Chūō, Tokyo